The Printer Setup Utility was an application in Mac OS X that served to allow the user to configure printers physically connected to the computer, or connected via a network. The Utility provided more specific tools than the more user friendly printers pane in System Preferences.

In Mac OS X 10.5 (Leopard), the Printer Setup Utility was removed and its features placed in the Print & Fax System Preferences pane. Viewing individual printers' queues was moved to a Printer Proxy application.

MacOS